Reginald King (1869–1955) was a solicitor politician in Queensland, Australia.  

Reginald King can also refer to: 
 Carlos Reginald King (born 1979), CEO of television production company, Kingdom Reign Entertainment.
 Reginald Brooks-King (1861–1938), Welsh archer.
 Reggie King (also known as Reginald Biddings King; born 1957), retired American professional basketball player.
 Reg King (1945–2010), English musician and songwriter.
 Reginald Arthur King (1927–2009), New Zealand soccer player. 
 Reginald Claude McMahon King (1904–1991), British composer and conductor, creator of Reginald King and his Orchestra